Maileus is a monotypic genus of  jumping spiders containing the single species, Maileus fuscus. It was first described by G. Peckham & Elizabeth Peckham in 1907, and is only found on Borneo. It is closely related to the genus Microhasarius.

Although no published drawings exist, Zabka has drawn the genitalia, and Proszynski has drawn the genitalia of both sexes of what is probably a different species of Maileus. No study has been published on the genus since its first description.

Name
The species name is derived from Latin fuscus "dusky, brown".

References

Monotypic Salticidae genera
Salticidae
Spiders of Asia